The Samsung SPH-i550 smartphone is the Palm OS-based planned successor to the clamshell style SPH-i500.  The SPH-i550 has a 320 x 320 internal screen and an external OLED display.  The camera takes 1 MP stills and can record video.  A built-in MP3 player is controlled by external buttons without having to open the phone.

Features
 Palm OS Garnet (5.4)
 MX1 CPU with 64 MB ROM / 32 MB RAM
 CDMA1x
 Clamshell form factor with dual displays, supports handwriting recognition
 320 x 320 pixel, 2.3 inch, 65,536 color display (internal)
 OLED 128 x 96 pixel display (external)
 3.15-megapixel digital camera with an LED flash
 Supports streaming media (VOD)
 MP3/MPEG4 player, controlled by external buttons without having to open the phone
 Web browser
 Infrared remote transmit
 Secure Digital (SD) memory expansion slot

A unique feature of the i550 is that all programs and data are stored in non-volatile flash memory so that a hard reset of the Palm device will not cause information loss.

As of April 2005, Sprint Corporation has cancelled plans for the SPH-i550. The i550 is offered by any carrier in the United States.  Just weeks after Sprint canceled the phone, it was announced that the SCH-i539, a Palm OS-based smartphone by Samsung that is very similar to the i550, was available in China.  The i539 is nearly identical to the i550, except that it uses a CDMA Removable User Identity Module (R-UIM), which is similar in function to a GSM SIM card.

Evidence on the Samsung Website indicates that a carrier in Mexico is in trials with the i550.  The devices being tested all have the Sprint logo.

A petition asking Sprint to release the i550 was created, but there has been no response from Sprint yet.

External links
 http://www.phonescoop.com/phones/phone.php?p=522
 Availability in Mexico

I550
Mobile phones introduced in 2004